Dragan Vukmir (born 2 August 1978) is a Serbian professional football manager and a former defender. He is the manager of Hungarian club Diósgyőr. He was capped once for Serbia and Montenegro.

Vukmir spent the majority of his career in Hungary, representing four clubs and amassing 299 appearances in the top flight. He won three national championships and three national cups.

Coaching career
Vukmir was hired as a manager by Diósgyőr on 8 April 2022. He was fired on 23 August 2022. On 3 January 2023, Vukmir was appointed manager of BFC Siófok.

Honours
Ferencváros
 Nemzeti Bajnokság I: 2003–04
 Magyar Kupa: 2002–03, 2003–04
Debrecen
 Nemzeti Bajnokság I: 2005–06, 2006–07
 Szuperkupa: 2006, 2007
Budapest Honvéd
 Magyar Kupa: 2008–09
MTK Budapest
 Nemzeti Bajnokság II: 2011–12

Career statistics

Club

References

External links

 HLSZ profile
 
 
 

Association football defenders
Budapest Honvéd FC players
Chinese Super League players
Dalian Shide F.C. players
Debreceni VSC players
Diósgyőri VTK managers
Expatriate footballers in China
Expatriate footballers in Hungary
Expatriate football managers in Hungary
Ferencvárosi TC footballers
First League of Serbia and Montenegro players
FK Dinamo Pančevo players
FK Rad players
MTK Budapest FC players
Nemzeti Bajnokság I players
Nemzeti Bajnokság II players
Sportspeople from Sremska Mitrovica
Serbia and Montenegro expatriate footballers
Serbia and Montenegro expatriate sportspeople in Hungary
Serbia and Montenegro footballers
Serbia and Montenegro international footballers
Serbian expatriate footballers
Serbian expatriate football managers
Serbian expatriate sportspeople in China
Serbian expatriate sportspeople in Hungary
Serbian footballers
Serbian football managers
BFC Siófok managers
1978 births
Living people